Hwang Ki-chul (born 2 September 1956) is a South Korean ex Navy chief served as the Minister of Patriots and Veterans Affairs from 2020 to 2022.

Hwang previously served as deputy chief of navy during Lee Myung-bak administration from 2011 to 2012 and its chief during the following Park Geun-hye administration from 2013 to 2015. He also served as the head of his alma mater from 2012 to 2013.

On 14 August 2021, Hwang will visit Kazakhstan as president's special envoy to retrieve body of Hong Beom-do, the general commander of Korean independence army against Japanese rule over Korea. 

He first entered politics in 2017. He joined then-candidate Moon Jae-in's presidential campaign in 2017. In the 2020 general election, he ran for Jinhae constituency which is his hometown and where major Navy facilities and his alma mater reside.      

Hwang is a Korea Naval Academy graduate. He holds three degrees - a bachelor in French language and literature from Korea University, a master's in history from University of Paris 1 Pantheon-Sorbonne and a MBA from Kyung Hee University. He also completed a doctorate programme in political science at Hannam University.

Effective dates of promotion

Electoral history

Awards 

  Order of National Security Merit by the government of South Korea (2017)
  Order of National Security Merit by the government of South Korea (2008)

References 

Living people
Government ministers of South Korea
Minjoo Party of Korea politicians
Korea University alumni
Pantheon-Sorbonne University alumni
1956 births
People from Changwon
Chiefs of Naval Operations (South Korea)
Korea Naval Academy alumni
Kyung Hee University alumni
Hannam University alumni
Changwon Hwang clan